Birmingham Business School may refer to:

 Birmingham Business School (University of Birmingham)
 Birmingham City Business School